Marion Torrent (born 17 April 1992) is a French professional footballer who plays for Division 1 Féminine club Montpellier and the France national team. She can play either as a defender or a defensive midfielder.

Club career
Torrent joined Montpellier HSC, after arriving from Marseille, at the age of 13. Footballing runs in her family as her older brother had previously been selected to the academy for Ligue 1 club AJ Auxerre. She quickly adapted to the change of scenery earning her first honor with the Montpellier under-16 team winning the Coupe Fédérale 16 ans following a 6–0 thrashing of Juvisy. On 1 May 2008, she made her competitive debut with the senior team playing the full 90 minutes in the club's 2–1 defeat to Hénin-Beaumont. She finished the season with four appearances. For the 2008–09 season, Torrent's playing time increased to eight games, which included five starts. She also appeared in two cup matches, which included playing the entire final against Le Mans, helping Montpellier win the 2008–09 edition of the Challenge de France.

Torrent was given the first team number 4 shirt for the 2009–10 season and was given a starting position in the squad by manager Sarah M'Barek. She has starred for the club in the newly created UEFA Women's Champions League appearing in four matches helping the club reach the main round.

International career
Torrent has been active with the women's section of the national team. She has earned caps with the women's under-16 and under-17. She was given the captaincy by under-16 manager Paco Rubio ahead of the 2008 edition of the Nordic Cup. In the tournament, France reached the final losing to  Germany 5–0. Her captaincy carried over to the under-17 team as she represented her nation at the 2009 UEFA Women's Under-17 Championship, where France finished in a respectable third-place position. Torrent scored her only goal with the under-17s in their 16–0 thrashing of Armenia during the qualification process.

Career statistics

Club

International

Scores and results list France's goal tally first, score column indicates score after each Torrent goal.

References

External links

 
 Profile at Montpellier HSC 
 Player French football stats at footofeminin.fr 
 
 

1992 births
Living people
French women's footballers
People from Châlons-en-Champagne
Montpellier HSC (women) players
Division 1 Féminine players
Women's association football defenders
Sportspeople from Marne (department)
2019 FIFA Women's World Cup players
France women's youth international footballers
France women's international footballers
UEFA Women's Euro 2022 players
Footballers from Grand Est
French people of Spanish descent